Grange GAA is a Gaelic Athletic Association club located near Fermoy, County Cork, Ireland. The club is almost exclusively concerned with the game of Gaelic football. The club plays in the Avondhu division of Cork GAA.

Honours

 Cork Junior Football Championship (1): 1979
 Cork Junior B Football Championship (1) 2019
 North Cork Junior A Football Championship (5): 1964, 1966, 1970, 1977, 1979
 North Cork Junior B Football Championship (2): 2016,2017
 North Cork Junior B Division 3 Football League  (1): 2011
 North Cork Junior B Division 2 Football League  (1): 2018

Notable players
 Ned Kirby - Cork senior footballer - All Ireland winning player with Cork in 1973
 Damien O'Hagan

References

External links
Grange GAA site
 

Gaelic games clubs in County Cork
Gaelic football clubs in County Cork